Still There is a point-and-click adventure video game developed by GhostShark Games and published by Iceberg Interactive.

Gameplay and Story
Still There is a sci-fi psychological point-and-click adventure video game. The game tells the story of Karl, the keeper of the Bento space-lighthouse. 
His job requires him to live in almost total isolation, performing routine maintenance and screening radio broadcasts, until the monotony is broken by a mysterious help request.

The gameplay is based on challenging technical puzzles that must be solved using the spaceship manual and the help of an in-board AI.
The story tackles difficult themes as grief and loss.

Development and release
Still There was developed by four people: Davide Barbieri (GhostShark Games), Daniele Giardini (Demigiant), Gaetano Leonardi (La Boite) and Ben Burnes (Abstraction Music). 
The engine used to develop the game was Unity 3D.

Still There was announced on 8 August 2019. 
and showcased at Gamescom on 22 August 2019. 
The game was published by Iceberg Interactive and released for Windows, macOS and Nintendo Switch on 20 November 2019.

Reception

Still There received "generally favorable" reviews from critics according to review aggregator Metacritic
and it is considered "strong" from critics according to review aggregator OpenCritic.

References

External links
 

Point-and-click adventure games
MacOS games
Video games developed in Italy
Indie video games
Iceberg Interactive games
2019 video games
Windows games
Nintendo Switch games
Single-player video games
Video games set in outer space
Adventure games set in space